Associazione Sportiva Roma lost its position as the dominant team in Rome, due to a mediocre season. New manager Vujadin Boškov had led Sampdoria to a domestic league title and European Cup final, but his only season in the capital was hampered by too many draws and struggles to be able to outplay the opposition. The end result was a tenth place, just three points clear of the drop zone, and Boškov left his job following the end of the season, when Roma also lost the Coppa Italia final to Torino.

Players

Goalkeepers
  Giovanni Cervone
  Patrizio Fimiani
  Giuseppe Zinetti

Defenders
  Aldair
  Silvano Benedetti
  Antonio Comi
  Luigi Garzya
  Fabio Petruzzi
  Dario Rossi

Midfielders
  Walter Bonacina
  Amedeo Carboni
  Giuseppe Giannini
  Thomas Häßler
  Siniša Mihajlović
  Giovanni Piacentini
  Fausto Salsano
  Antonio Tempestilli
  Marco Caputi

Forwards
  Claudio Caniggia
  Andrea Carnevale
  Roberto Muzzi
  Ruggiero Rizzitelli
  Francesco Totti

Competitions

Overall

Last updated: 19 June 1993

Serie A

League table

Results summary

Results by round

Matches

Coppa Italia

Second round

Round of 16

Quarter-finals

Semi-finals

Final

UEFA Cup

First round

Second round

Third round

Quarter-finals

Statistics

Goalscorers
  Giuseppe Giannini 9 (1)
  Andrea Carnevale 7
  Ruggiero Rizzitelli 7
  Thomas Häßler 6 (1)
  Claudio Caniggia 4

References

A.S. Roma seasons
Roma